Centre Point Sabah is a shopping centre located in the city of Kota Kinabalu, Sabah, Malaysia. It is one of the earliest shopping mall in the city, together with Karamunsing Complex and Wisma Merdeka.

See also 
 List of shopping malls in Malaysia

References

External links 
 

Buildings and structures in Kota Kinabalu
Shopping malls in Sabah